Kenny Lattimore (born April 10, 1970) is an American R&B singer.

Early life 
Lattimore first developed his interest for music in the high school band program at Eleanor Roosevelt High School in Greenbelt, Maryland. He often acknowledges Dr. Barbara Baker for setting him on his current path. Lattimore spoke at the 2005 Eleanor Roosevelt High School Graduation. He is an alumnus of Howard University in Washington, D.C.

Career

1988–1991: Maniquin 
A stint as session vocalist for R&B group Maniquin led to an official place in the group as lead singer. D'Extra Wiley of the 1990s R&B group II D Extreme was also a member of Maniquin, briefly before signing to MCA Records. The group released a lone self-titled album for Epic Records in 1989. Its lead single "I Wanna Ride" was an answer to the hit single "Mercedes Boy" by Pebbles in both sound and lyric. Both artists' singles were produced and co-written by Charlie Wilson of Gap Band fame. Lattimore soon left Maniquin to pursue a solo career, and the group subsequently disbanded.

1994–1999: Kenny Lattimore and From the Soul of Man 
Lattimore signed with Columbia Records in late 1994 and released his own debut album Kenny Lattimore in 1996. That set included a pair of Top 20 hits: "Never Too Busy" and the Grammy-nominated "For You", written by high school friend Kenny Lerum. The album earned Lattimore a win for Best New Artist at the NAACP Image Awards in 1996, and eventually achieved Gold sales status.

He followed up his debut with From the Soul of Man, another critically acclaimed set of classically styled soul music in 1998, yielding the hits "Days Like This" and "If I Lose My Woman" along with a standout cover of The Beatles' "While My Guitar Gently Weeps".

2000–2006: Arista Records and Weekend 
After a short hiatus, the singer re-emerged on Arista Records when then-president Clive Davis signed him to a new contract. He eventually released a more contemporary R&B album, 2001's Weekend under L.A. Reid's regime, as Davis was only allowed to take a small defined number of artists to his next venture, J Records. The title track and first single was anchored by a sample of Blondie's "Rapture" and became a radio favorite on both sides of the Atlantic. Davis may have had a different vision for his career, but he ended up recording three albums for Arista Records as Reid also had a vision that included a modern-day version of a classic soul duo with his new bride, the Gold-level artist Chante Moore whom he recorded two duet albums that were both critically and commercially acclaimed. In keeping with the "lover man" image that came to the fore with the hits that launched his career, Lattimore is known for his dramatic stage shows, vocal agility and romantic ambiance. The New York Times called him as a "modern soul man" on stage. The singer has long established in interviews his personal mission to show the "strong, but sensitive and caring side of Black men."

In 2003, Lattimore and his then-wife Chante Moore released a duet album titled Things That Lovers Do consisting of classic soul songs from the 1970s and 1980s plus two new original songs. The standout singles were the smooth and contemporary "Loveable (From Your Head to Your Toes)" and a cover of René & Angela's "You Don't Have To Cry". Lattimore and Moore continued promoting the album with a successful touring stage show.

Following Things That Lovers Do, Lattimore released another collaborative album with Moore. The duo released their second collaborative album titled Uncovered/Covered (2006). The album peaked at number-ten on the Billboard R&B Charts and number-two on the Billboard Gospel charts. The duo's cover version of "You're All I Need to Get By" served as the theme song for the BET reality series The Family Crews.

2008–present: Recent activities 
Lattimore released a cover album with Verve Records titled Timeless on September 9, 2008. The lead single "You Are My Starship" was originally performed by Norman Connor featuring Michael Henderson. Lattimore was also featured on the uptempo dance song "Another Love" by Brian Culbertson.

Lattimore started his own record company SincereSoul Records in 2012. He released his album Back 2 Cool on January 22, 2013. The album's first single "Find a Way" (produced by Ivan "Orthodox" Barias & Carvin "Ransum" Higgins) hit radio on Valentine's Day 2012. The second single "Back 2 Cool" featured Kelly Price.

Personal life 
In January 2002, Lattimore married singer Chanté Moore in Jamaica. On April 10, 2003, Moore gave birth to their son Kenny Lattimore Jr. In July 2011, it was announced that the two had divorced.

On March 8, 2020, Lattimore married American judge Faith Jenkins. In late 2022, it was announced they were expecting their first child together. The pair welcomed a daughter in January 2023.

Discography 

Studio albums
 Kenny Lattimore (1996)
 From the Soul of Man (1998)
 Weekend (2001)
 Timeless (2008)
 Anatomy of a Love Song (2015)
 A Kenny Lattimore Christmas (2016)
 Vulnerable (2017)
 Here to Stay (2021)

Collaborative albums
 Things That Lovers Do  (2003)
 Uncovered/Covered  (2006)

References

External links 

1970 births
American contemporary R&B singers
American male singer-songwriters
American music video directors
American male pop singers
American soul singers
American tenors
Ballad musicians
Howard University alumni
Living people
People from Greenbelt, Maryland
African-American male songwriters
20th-century African-American male singers
21st-century African-American male singers